An Grianán Theatre is the largest theatre in County Donegal. Located in Letterkenny's Port Road district, its current director is Patricia McBride. With a seating capacity of 383, the theatre provides a range of programming including drama, comedy, music, pantomime, and family shows as well as workshops and classes.

It is used annually as a festival venue, including for the Earagail Arts Festival, and has twice hosted Fleadh Cheoil na hÉireann. It is a main partner of the Earagail Arts Festival, which takes place each year in July, the Irish Aerial Dance Fest which takes place each June and the Letterkenny Trad Week which takes places each January.

The theatre was named after Grianán of Aileach (‘Stony House of the Sun’), a prehistoric ring fort located in Burt believed to date back to 1700 BCE.

History
In 1995, Labour politician Seán Maloney advised the then Minister for the Arts, Culture and the Gaeltacht Michael D. Higgins to view a site in Letterkenny in exchange for a lift to a Labour Party function in Donegal. Higgins visited the Rectory Field, declared it the best site for a theatre he had ever seen and approved a £1.5 million grant the following February for what would become An Grianán Theatre. The North West Theatre Project launched a major fundraising campaign in March 1997.

An Grianán first opened its doors on Monday 4 October 1999 and had its official opening later that year on 12 November. Magic of the Musicals was the first show performed on the An Grianán stage.

It hosted Fleadh Cheoil na hÉireann in the summers of 2005 and 2006. It hosted the Pan Celtic Festival in 2007.

On Saturday 12 May 2007, a Rathmullan based graphic design studio picked up the 2007 European Design Award in Athens, Greece. A jury of Europe's top design critics selected the studio's variable design for An Grianán Theatre from a pool of work by many other top European designers.

In 2015 it won an award for its Disability Access.

In 2013 it won an award as the IMRO Ulster Music Venue of The Year.

Performances

Music
An Grianán has attracted a number of well-known musicians, actors, and comedians in recent years. The Frames play there on a regular basis. The Letterkenny Trad Week, which took place in January 2015, featured a number of artists such as Maura O’Connell and Karan Casey, Paddy Glackin and John Doyle. Scottish singer Isla Grant made a return to Ireland in February 2015 with her tour, playing in An Grianán on the 10th. Back in 2005, Sharon Shannon played in An Grianán.

In 2000, An Grianán was the venue for the world premiere of the new Irish musical Caisleain Oir. The entire run of performances was sold out and the production company restaged it the following year, again to packed houses. The musical is based on the Irish novel of the same name but it is in the English language. Again in 2005, another production of the musical was a complete sellout.

Below is a list of other notable bands and musicians who have performed at An Grianán:
 Albert Niland (13 October 2006)
 Sharon Shannon (4 May 2005)
 Jack L (4 November 2006)

Comedy
Ardal O’Hanlon brought his stand-up act to An Grianán in May 2012 (Ardal played Father Dougal McGuire in Father Ted). Neil Delamare has also performed there with his show The Fresh Prince of Delamare.
Other comedians to perform at the venue have included:

 Des Bishop 
 Tommy Tiernan
 Ardal O'Hanlon
 Dara Ó Briain
 Dylan Moran
 Ed Byrne
 Jimmy Carr
 Colin Murphy
 Neil Delamere
 Andrew Maxwell
 Brendan Grace
 Pat Shortt
 Jon Kenny
 Phil Kay
 Jason Byrne
 David O'Doherty

Drama and dance
Some drama or dance acts that performed in 2014:
 Ireland's most acclaimed dance company, Fabulous Beast came to An Grianán in September 2014 with their international hit Rian UnPlugged. The Irish Aerial Dance Fest provides workshops and performances for three weeks each June. 

Below is a list of notable dramas and dances which were performed at An Grianán in 2006:

National and international
 Knots by CoisCeim Dance Theatre (21 February 2006)
 Like Watching Paint Dry by Ursula Mawson-Raffalt and Anthony J Faulder-Mawson (21—23 September 2006)
 I Miss Communism by Inez Wurth and Mark Soper (29 September 2006)
 Death of a Salesman by Arthur Miller – (Keegan Theatre Co) (10—11 October2006)

Local
 12 Angry Men performed by Lifford Players (14–—15 March 2006)
 Ay Carmela by José Sanchis Sinisterra in association with Wink Productions (21–22 March 2006)

Facilities

Public facilities
An Grianán can also be used as a corporate venue, offering advanced technical and catering facilities. In addition to this, a full range of projection equipment is available for use.

The eatery café is open all day, and transforms into a bar on show nights. There are a variety of options on the menu, whether you're looking for just a tea or coffee, or something more substantial. There is also a free car park to the rear of the theatre.

There are full facilities for people with disabilities including designated seating in the auditorium, a lift and specially adapted WC. There is also an inductive loop hearing system.

There is ample and spacious parking to the rear of the building.

Private facilities
The backstage area has a number of facilities for visiting performers including three dressing rooms, private bathrooms and a green room. There is a framed T-shirt in the green room declaring it ‘the best room in Ireland’ signed by Oscar-winning songwriter Glen Hansard of  The Frames. There is also a costume department that can be found through a series of doors off the downstairs foyer that has a number of props and costumes from previous shows. There are also a number of workshop areas backstage and off the foyer downstairs. A mirror may be found on the right as one heads from the green room toward the stage. The stage is entered through a door from the left-hand side facing the audience.

Exhibitions

The foyers and public galleries are used as an exhibition space.
Recent exhibits are listed below:

Some recent ones include: “Ephemera an exhibition by Robert Clarke” (September 2014), “Fairytale Fantasies with Samantha Robinson” (October 2014)  and “serene by Katriona Dempsey and Valerie Würmli” (February/March 2015).

13 March saw the official opening of the Names Will Never Hurt Me exhibition put together by members of the LOFT LK. The exhibition was run in conjunction with the LOFT's Mental Health Week and contains a number of images on canvas and paper of various themes associated with mental health. Some of the images have attracted controversy due to their content.

Workshops and classes
LYT
Letterkenny Youth Theatre is run in association with An Grianán Theatre and usually meets on Wednesdays. It offers the chance for young people to gain valuable experience in areas such as acting skills and stage management. It has run a number of small one-off productions in the past in Letterkenny. Some past LYT shows include Alien Nation (2008), La Vide de Picasso (2009), and The Taming of the Shrew (2010). On Thursday 25 June and Friday 26 June 2009, LYT ran a two-night show in the theatre in which they performed a devised piece entitled La Vide de Picasso. LYT performed The Taming of the Shrew in 2010. On 22 August 2010, LYT entertained crowds at a festival in the Glebe Gallery by performing various different monologues.

References

External links
 Official website

Buildings and structures in Letterkenny
Culture in Letterkenny
Theatres in the Republic of Ireland
Tourist attractions in County Donegal